Knowle may refer to:

Places in England
Knowle, Bristol, a district and council ward of Bristol
Knowle West, a neighbourhood in the south of Bristol, adjacent to Knowle
Knowle, Devon, a village in Braunton parish
Knowle, Budleigh Salterton, a location in Devon
Knowle, Copplestone, a location in Devon
Knowle, Cullompton, a location in Devon
Knowle, Hampshire, a village
Knowle Halt railway station
Knowle, Shropshire, a village
Knowle, West Midlands, a village
Knowle F.C., a football club
Knowle St Giles, village and parish in Somerset

People with the surname
Julian Knowle (born 1974), Austrian tennis player

See also
Knole, the estate at Sevenoaks in Kent now owned by the National Trust
Knowle Hill
Knowle Stadium
Knowles (disambiguation)
Knoll (disambiguation)
Noel (disambiguation)
Nowell (disambiguation)